César Valverde (born 23 August 1951) is a Colombian footballer. He played in five matches for the Colombia national football team from 1979 to 1981. He was also part of Colombia's squad for the 1979 Copa América tournament.

References

External links
 

1951 births
Living people
Colombian footballers
Colombia international footballers
Association football midfielders
Deportivo Cali footballers
Deportivo Pereira footballers